The following highways are numbered 775:

United States